The following is a list of pipeline accidents in the United States in 2003. It is one of several lists of U.S. pipeline accidents. See also list of natural gas and oil production accidents in the United States.

Incidents 

This is not a complete list of all pipeline accidents. For natural gas alone, the Pipeline and Hazardous Materials Safety Administration (PHMSA), a United States Department of Transportation agency, has collected data on more than 3,200 accidents deemed serious or significant since 1987.

A "significant incident" results in any of the following consequences:
 fatality or injury requiring in-patient hospitalization
 $50,000 or more in total costs, measured in 1984 dollars
 liquid releases of five or more barrels (42 US gal/barrel)
 releases resulting in an unintentional fire or explosion

PHMSA and the National Transportation Safety Board (NTSB) post incident data and results of investigations into accidents involving pipelines that carry a variety of products, including natural gas, oil, diesel fuel, gasoline, kerosene, jet fuel, carbon dioxide, and other substances. Occasionally pipelines are repurposed to carry different products.

 On January 7, 2003, at a "high consequence area" in Anaheim, California, a downed power line struck a Southern California Gas casing vent; electricity traveled along the casing and arced onto the natural gas transmission line inside the casing, perforating the steel pipe with a one-inch puncture. Two more leaks were found at locations where the electricity left the transmission line. The pipe was manufactured in 1947.
 On January 24, an Enbridge crude oil pipeline ruptured at a terminal in Douglas County, Wisconsin. Some of the crude oil flowed into the Nemadji River. Over  were spilled.
 On February 2, a natural gas pipeline ruptured near Viola, Illinois, resulting in the release of natural gas which ignited. A 16-foot section of the pipe fractured into three sections, which were ejected to distances of about 300 yards from the failure site. The 24-inch diameter natural gas transmission pipeline ruptured and a fire resulted on the ANR southwest mainline about 5 miles upstream of the New Windsor compressor station. Thirty people were evacuated as a precaution. Investigators found that the failure occurred in part due to cold weather acting on a major sag bend passing under a creek bed. The ambient temperatures contributed to pipe contraction and saturated soil over the pipe increased frost heave, apparently flexing the pipe until it separated around its circumference at a seam. The pipe was manufactured in 1949.
 On February 20, a 24-inch gas transmission pipeline started leaking in Scott County, Missouri, underneath the Mississippi River. A shifted pipeline weight had caused damage to the pipeline.
 On or about February 22, 2003, approximately 788 barrels of gasoline were discharged from a portion of Plantation Pipeline in Hull, Georgia, some of which entered into an unnamed tributary of East Sandy Creek and its adjoining shorelines. The spill resulted from a failed gasket on a buried block valve.
 On February 27, dropping temperatures caused an Enbridge pipeline to fail in Samaria, Michigan. 130 barrels of crude oil were spilled.
 On March 13, a seam failed on an 8-inch Dixie Pipeline propane line near Appling, Georgia, releasing about 110,000 gallons of propane. There were no injuries. The pipe split due to seam failure.
 On March 23, a 24-inch El Paso Natural Gas pipeline near Eaton, Colorado, exploded. The explosion sent flames 160 meters in the air, forcing evacuations. No one was injured. The heat from the flames melted the siding of two nearby houses and started many smaller grass fires.
 On April 1, a 12-inch ConocoPhillips petroleum products pipeline ruptured, spilling about 1,000 barrels of diesel fuel near Ponca City, Oklahoma, with most of the fuel getting into Doga Creek. There were no injuries. Low frequency ERW pipe seam failure was suspected as the cause.
 On April 2, 2003, at Playa del Rey, California, atmospheric corrosion caused a pinhole leak on a Southern California Gas instrument gas supply line, resulting in an unplanned emergency shutdown. After shutdown, the blowdown released natural gas and liquids (crude oil and water) into the atmosphere, causing mist damage to neighboring homes, landscaping and vehicles. The faulty part was installed in 1970. Public and private property damage was $2,395,000.
 On May 1, a 26-inch Williams Companies natural gas transmission pipeline failed near Lake Tapps, Washington. About 120 people were evacuated from a neighboring elementary school, a supermarket, and 30 to 40 houses in approximately a  area. There was no fire or injuries. Land movement was suspected at first, but the failure was later determined to be from stress corrosion cracking. There were four previous failures on this pipeline in the preceding eight years. The pipe was manufactured and installed in 1956.
 On May 8, an 8-inch LPG pipeline failed near Lebanon, Ohio. About 80 houses and one school in the area were evacuated. There was no fire or injuries.
 On May 20, a 30-inch gas transmission pipeline exploded and burned near Nederland, Texas. The cause of the failure was internal corrosion, and the damages were estimated to be $6,901,322. The Houston Pipeline Company explosion did public and private property damage of $5,170,000. The cause of the leak was galvanic corrosion on the part installed in 1975. The rupture and fire damaged nearby electric lines and several unoccupied buildings that were part of the Sunoco terminal facility.
 On June 17, 2003, at West Salem, Wisconsin, a canoeist reported seeing bubbles in the Lacrosse River and noted the pipeline signs. Investigators found a Northern Natural Gas pipe exposed in the river bottom. The leak was from a circumferential crack that appeared to have started to crease in the pipe during its original installation in 1963.
 On July 2, 2003, a small single engine aircraft had mechanical failure shortly after takeoff from the Linden, New Jersey, airport and was forced to attempt an emergency landing at the Texas Eastern Transmission Corporation (Duke) compressor station. The aircraft collided with some pipeline facilities resulting in nearly $60,000 damage to the natural gas compressor station. 
 On July 2, excavation damage to a natural gas distribution line resulted in an explosion and fire in Wilmington, Delaware. A contractor hired by the city of Wilmington to replace sidewalk and curbing, dug into an unmarked natural gas service line with a backhoe. Although the service line did not leak where it was struck, the contact resulted in a break in the line inside the basement of a nearby building, where gas began to accumulate. A manager for the contractor said that he did not smell gas and therefore did not believe there was imminent danger and that he called an employee of the gas company and left a voice mail message. At approximately 1:44 p.m., an explosion destroyed two residences and damaged two others to the extent that they had to be demolished. Other nearby residences sustained some damage, and the residents on the block were displaced from their houses for about a week. Three contractor employees sustained serious injuries. Eleven additional people sustained minor injuries.
 On July 3, a jury found Texas-New Mexico Pipeline (TNMP) Company guilty of fraud, gross negligence and willful misconduct in concealing a 1992 crude oil pipeline leak beneath a Midland, Texas, residential subdivision, before selling the pipeline to EOTT Energy in 1999. Oil was discovered in the water table in late 2000, and in March 2001 a group of Midland residents sued EOTT, TNMP and Equilon. Residents living on affected land also received settlements. The spill was estimated in 2003 to be 9,000–13,000 barrels. 190 boxes full of TNMP documents about the pipeline dating from the late 1980s to early 1990s (prior to EOTT Energy taking over the pipeline) were dug up from a 45-foot-deep hole at a site along the company's pipeline in New Mexico.
 On July 10, a 16-inch diameter Citgo petroleum products pipeline failed in Cook County, Illinois. About 25 barrels of gasoline were spilled from the pipeline. A crack in the pipe had developed at a dent. There was no fire or injuries reported.
 On July 16, a 12 3/4-inch pipeline burst in Barnes County, North Dakota, releasing 9,000 barrels of propane, which ignited. There were no casualties. During repairs, mechanical damage was seen on two nearby sections of this pipeline.
 On July 30, a Kinder Morgan pipeline in Tucson, Arizona, ruptured and sprayed 16,548 gallons of gasoline on five houses under construction, flooding nearby streets with gasoline. The resulting pipeline closure caused major gas shortages and price increases in the state. The failure at first was thought to be from LF ERW flaws, but tests showed it was due to stress corrosion cracking. A hydrostatic test that was performed on this pipeline after repairs failed again  from the first failure.
 On August 8, a 26-inch Kinder Morgan and Myria Holdings Natural Gas Pipeline Company of America transmission pipeline ruptured in Caddo County, Oklahoma, releasing about 84,000 MCF of natural gas. A 54-foot long section of 26-inch diameter pipe had blown out and landed 30 feet from the ditch. Evacuations took place within  of a mile from the release, but there was no fire or casualties. Stress corrosion cracking was identified as the pipe failure's cause. The 26-inch diameter pipe was manufactured in 1956.
 On September 26, a propane pipeline at the Phillips Petroleum storage facility in Cahokia, Illinois, ruptured, sending flames high into the air and sparking small grass fires in the area.
 On October 6, a 12-inch petroleum products pipeline ruptured in Johnson County, Kansas, spilling about 100 to 200 barrels of diesel fuel. Some of the fuel contaminated a nearby waterway. There were no injuries.
 On October 13, a failure on an Enbridge pipeline near Bay City, Michigan spilled 500 barrels of crude oil.
 On October 14, a leak on what was originally the Big Inch 24-inch diameter natural gas transmission pipeline occurred in Orange County, Indiana. There were no injuries or evacuations. The longitudinal crack was attributed to external corrosion; the pipe had been installed in 1943.
 On November 2, a Texas Eastern Transmission Pipeline natural gas pipeline exploded, in Bath County, Kentucky, about 1.5 km south of a Duke Energy pumping station. A fire burned for about an hour before firefighters extinguished it. No one was injured and no property damage was reported. Investigators found that the pipe, manufactured in 1957, had two separate manufacturing defects.
 On November 9, an 8-inch Buckeye Partners pipeline failed near Mazon, Illinois. While repairs were being tested on this pipeline on November 14, another section of this pipeline failed about 1500 feet from the first leak. About ten barrels of gasoline and diesel fuel were spilled by the two leaks, requiring soil removal. External corrosion caused both failures. There were no injuries.
 On December 13, another section of the same Williams Companies gas transmission pipeline that failed on May 1, 2003, failed in Lewis County, Washington. There was no fire this time. Gas flowed for three hours before being shut off. Gas pressure had already been reduced 20% on this pipeline after the May 1 explosion. External corrosion and stress corrosion cracking were seen in this 26-inch diameter pipe, which had been manufactured in 1956.

References 

Lists of pipeline accidents in the United States
2003 disasters in the United States